Tmesisternus venatus is a species of beetle in the family Cerambycidae. It was described by James Thomson in 1864.

Subspecies
 Tmesisternus venatus venatus (Thomson, 1864)
 Tmesisternus venatus djampeanus Breuning, 1950
 Tmesisternus venatus kangeanus Breuning, 1969

References

venatus
Beetles described in 1864